Pierpaolo Piccioli (born 1967) is an Italian fashion designer, and has been the creative director of Valentino since 2008, jointly with Maria Grazia Chiuri from 2008 to 2016.

Early life 
Piccioli was born in Nettuno in 1967.

Piccioli studied literature at Rome University, followed by a course in experimental fashion.

Career
In 2018 and 2022, Piccioli won "designer of the year" at The Fashion Awards.

Personal life 
He is married with three children, and lives in Nettuno, the coastal town where he was raised. He travels one hour to Rome for work.

References

Living people
Italian fashion designers
People from Nettuno
1967 births
Creative directors
Rome University of Fine Arts alumni